Pusapati Ananda Gajapati Raju  (31 December 1850 – 23 May 1897) was the Maharaja of the Vizianagaram kingdom.

Royal Family

The house of Pusapati claims lineage from the Sisodias of Mewar. According to Edward B. Eastwick, The Maharajah of Vijayanagaram traces his ancestry from the Sisodia branch of the Guhilot tribes and is of the Vasistha Gotra. A brother of the Maharana migrated to Oudh, and in 529 A.D. his descendant, Madhava Varma, marched with four clans into the Deccan, and conquered the country from Ramanad to Katak. His capital was Bezawada, afterwards transferred to Vijayanagar. His descendants reigned over this kingdom for 921 years. In 1512 they were subjected by Sultan Kuli of the Golkonda dynasty. Under the 5th King of that line an ancestor of the present ruler of Vijayanagaram was made Subahdar of the North Sarkars. The Emperor Aurangzeb confirmed the Subahdar in his office and gave him a two-edged sword(zulfikar), which is still used in the coat-of-arms of the family. In 1817 the father of the present ruler made over his estate to Government to clear off his debts of 200,000 rupees. In 1827 he again made over his estate and died at Banaras, leaving a debt of 1,100,000. His successor, the later Maharajah Vijayarama Gajapati Raju III, was recognized in the room of his father in 1845 and had several honors conferred on him by the British Government. Lord Northbrook obtained for him the title of His Highness, and had his name enrolled among those of chiefs entitled to return visits from the Viceroy. He was clear of debt and distinguished himself by many acts of charity. His son was born 31 December 1850 and a daughter is married to His Highness Maharaj Kumar Singh, cousin and heir apparent of H.H.Maharajah of Rewah. Still in the coastal Andhra region, the last name Pusapati is associated with this ruling dynasty. Additionally, the Pusapati has obtained power in modern India through participation in Government.

The Rajahs of Vizianagaram obtained the title of 'Gajapathi', by right of conquest after the battle of Nandapur in the Northern Circars against Balaram Dev III of Jeypore Kingdom in the sixteenth century.

Ananda Gajapati was the second of the three children, born to Maharajah Vijayarama Gajapati Raju. Narayana Gajapati (10-2-1850 - 29-9-1863) was his elder brother and Appala Kondayamba (16-2-1859 - 14-12-1912) was his younger sister.

Noble scion of a Noble house
Ananda Gajapati learnt Sanskrit under the guidance of eminent scholars like Bhagavathula Hari Sastry, Mysore Bhimacharyulu and Mudumbai Narasimha Swamy. Major Thomson and Lingam Lakshmoji taught him English. He was proficient in Latin and French.

During the rule of Maharajah Ananda Gajapati, education, literature and music received a tremendous fillip and Telugu culture throve considerably. Known widely for both munificence and cultural magnificence, Ananda Gajapati Raju was granted the personal title of 'Maharajah'. He was a Member of the Madras Legislative Council for many years and was created a G.C.I.E. in 1892. He was held in awe, reverence and admiration as the most cultured and munificent, the most erudite and graceful, the most accomplished and humane of all the princes of Vizianagaram till his time.

Abhinava Andhra Bhoja
Maharajah Ananda Gajapati had been acclaimed throughout the Telugu speaking world as Abhinava Andhra Boja. He richly deserved the title both for his personal accomplishments and tastes. He spared no effort to make Vizianagaram the center of learning, a Banaras in Andhra Desa.

Satavadhani Chellapilla wrote and published an essay in Krishna Patrika in 1941 about the Vizianagaram Samsthanam. Ananda Gajapati revered tradition and exerted himself to the utmost to uphold and maintain it. His court was a regular meeting ground for men of varied attainments. His patronage of scholars, poets, literature and artists are comparable to Krishna Deva Raya of Hampi Vijayanagaram. The Diggajas of Maharajah Ananda Gajapati's court are Mudumbai Narasimachari, Varaha Narasimha, Kolluru Kama Sastri, the poet, Peri Venkata Sastri, the master of Shastras and his son Peri Kasinadha Sastri. He assigned them projects and commissioned the translation of Dharma Sastras.

He generously gave financial support of a lakh rupees to Max Müller for his translational work of Rig Veda.

Poona Gayani Samaj was a society founded for the purpose of promoting out classical music mainly Hindusthani music on 13 September 1894. It was heavily funded by Ananda Gajapati Raju. He helped and funded the publication of Gayala Siddanjanam and Swara Manjari written by Tachchuri Singracharya brothers of Madras. Ananda Gajapati had in his court an Italian Band set consisting of 48 players and a Shehnai troupe with twelve players. He was said to have tutored the eminent Veena Venkata Ramana.

Reputed actors and stage artists were part of his court. Jagannadha Vilasini was a dramatic society started during his father's reign in 1874 and used to give performances in Sanskrit and Telugu at Pithapuram and Madras. The chief of the actors was Butchi Sastry and the society was also referred to as 'Butchi Sastry Troupe'. Ananda Gajapati has invited Gomatham Srinivasa Charyulu, known as Indian Garrick to his court and also patronized the play Harischandra he wrote in English.

The Maharajah had a forward-looking temperament and progressive views. He it was who originally initiated social reform. Gurajada Appa Rao who wrote the epoch-making play Kanyasulkam dedicated it to the Maharajah. The writer declares in his preface to the first edition that the Maharajah inaugurated a brilliant epoch in the history of Telugu Literature.

Gurazada Srirama Murty was one of the most accomplished researches oriented scholar in the court of Vizianagaram.

The Historiographer
Vizianagaram Treaty of 15 November 1758 and the end of fifteen years war between the English and the French for the sovereignty of India from 1744 to 1759 A.D. was the work of a historiographer. Ananda Gajapati Raju composed and got it printed by Vest and company, Madras in 1894. He quoted extensively from various historical sources, the chief of which was The History of the Rise and Progress of the Bengal Army. He collected data from more than forty scholars, historians, poets and documenters; some of the most important are: Orme, Broome, Cambridge, Carmichael, Gleiig, Taylor and Adams, Pusapati Vijayarama Raju, Meer Alum, Megasthenes and Huen Tsang. His admiration for the glory of his forebears and their glorious past where his ancestors paved the way for the firm establishment of the British power in the country culminated in this master piece of his research work.

Further reading
Ananda Gajapati: Vizianagaram Treaty., Vest and Co., Madras, 1894.
Dr. V. V. B. Rama Rao: Poosapati Ananda Gajapati Raju., Published by International Telugu Institute, Hyderabad, 1985.

References

1850 births
1897 deaths
Telugu people
Telugu monarchs
Knights Grand Commander of the Order of the Indian Empire
Indian knights
19th-century Indian people
People from Uttarandhra